The High Commission of Lesotho in London is the diplomatic mission of Lesotho in the United Kingdom. Situated in Belgravia, London it is one of 166 different Embassies  and high commissions in London. It is one of the five diplomatic missions of Lesotho located in Europe. The High Commissioner Her Excellency Mrs. Rethabile M. Mokaeane

References

External links
 Official site

Lesotho
Diplomatic missions of Lesotho
Lesotho and the Commonwealth of Nations
Lesotho–United Kingdom relations
Buildings and structures in the City of Westminster
Belgravia
United Kingdom and the Commonwealth of Nations